Jeffrey Stuart Sutton (born October 31, 1960) is an American lawyer and jurist serving as the Chief United States circuit judge of the United States Court of Appeals for the Sixth Circuit.

Early life and career
Sutton received a Bachelor of Arts degree in history from Williams College in 1983. Sutton worked as a paralegal in Washington, D.C. and spent a summer at an archaeological dig site in Jordan as part of a United States Department of State cultural exchange program, then returned to Ohio to be a high school history teacher and varsity soccer coach at the Columbus Academy, a private school in Gahanna, Ohio.

Sutton received his Juris Doctor from Ohio State University's Moritz College of Law in 1990. He then clerked for Judge Thomas Meskill of the United States Court of Appeals for the Second Circuit from 1990 to 1991. Next he clerked at the United States Supreme Court from 1991 to 1992, primarily working under Antonin Scalia, who later said Sutton was "one of the very best law clerks [he] ever had", as well as for Lewis F. Powell Jr., who had assumed senior status.

Sutton was in private practice in Columbus from 1992 to 1995 and 1998 to 2003, serving as Solicitor General of Ohio from 1995 to 1998. He has also served as an adjunct professor of law at the Ohio State University Moritz College of Law since 1994 and more recently as a visiting lecturer at Harvard Law School.  He teaches state constitutional law, a subject in which he is particularly interested and about which he has written extensively.

Federal judicial service

Sutton was first nominated by President George W. Bush on May 9, 2001, to a seat on the Sixth Circuit vacated by David A. Nelson, who assumed senior status on October 1, 1999. That nomination, made during the 107th United States Congress, never received a floor vote in the United States Senate. Sutton was not confirmed until almost two years later, on April 29, 2003, when the Senate of the 108th United States Congress confirmed him by a 52–41 vote. He received his commission on May 5, 2003. He became Chief Judge on May 1, 2021.

Notable opinions
In 2007, Sutton dissented in part when the Sixth Circuit held that a police officer did not have qualified immunity for arresting a speaker for using foul language at a town meeting.  In June 2011, Sutton became the first judge appointed by a Republican to rule in favor of the health care mandate in President Barack Obama's Health Care law.

In November 2014, Sutton authored the 2–1 opinion ruling upholding same-sex marriage bans in Michigan, Kentucky, Ohio, and Tennessee in the Sixth Circuit reversing six previous federal district court rulings. The ruling was the second federal court ruling and the only Federal Court of Appeals ruling to uphold same-sex marriage bans after the U.S. Supreme Court struck down a portion of the Defense of Marriage Act in United States v. Windsor in June 2013. This ran counter to rulings by the U.S. Courts of Appeals for the 4th, 7th, 9th and 10th circuits, which then led the U.S. Supreme Court to grant writ of certiorari to review same-sex marriage bans when it previously declined to do so. In Obergefell v. Hodges the Supreme Court reversed the decision of the Sixth Circuit.

Feeder judge 
Since joining the bench, Judge Sutton has been one of the most prolific feeder judges, sending a number of his law clerks to the Supreme Court.

Other 
Sutton chaired the Advisory Committee on Appellate Rules of the Judicial Conference of the United States from 2009 to 2012, and served on the committee beginning in 2005. He went on to chair the Committee on Rules of Practice and Procedure from 2012 to 2015.

Other views
On a podcast with Harvard Law School professor Noah Feldman, Judge Sutton, a conservative originalist, expressed the view that the United States Supreme Court's December 2000 decision in Bush v. Gore was wrongly decided.

Published works
51 Imperfect Solutions: States and the Making of American Constitutional Law (Oxford Univ. Press 2018).
The Certiorari Process and State Court Decisions, 131 Harv. L. Rev. F. 167 (2018) (with Brittany Jones).
Courts as Change Agents: Do We Want More — Or Less?, 127 Harv. L. Rev. 1419 (2014).
Barnette, Frankfurter, and Judicial Review, 96 Marq. L. Rev. 133 (2012).
What Does—and Does Not—Ail State Constitutional Law, 59 U. Kan. L. Rev. 687 (2011).
State Constitutional Law: The Modern Experience (2010) (with Randy J. Holland, Stephen R. McAllister, and Jeffrey M. Shaman).
A Review of Richard A. Posner How Judges Think (2008), 108 Mich. L. Rev. 859 (2010).
The Role of History in Judging Disputes About the Meaning of the Constitution, 41 Tex. Tech L. Rev. 1173 (2009).
Why Teach—And Why Study—State Constitutional Law, 34 Okla. City U. L. Rev. 165 (2009).
San Antonio Independent School District v. Rodriguez and its Aftermath, 94 Va. L. Rev. 1963 (2008).
An Appellate Perspective on Federal Sentencing After Booker and Rita, 85 Denv. U. L. Rev. 79 (2007).

See also 
 List of law clerks of the Supreme Court of the United States (Seat 1)
 List of law clerks of the Supreme Court of the United States (Seat 9)

References

External links
 
 Appearances at the U.S. Supreme Court from the Oyez Project

|-

1960 births
Living people
20th-century American lawyers
21st-century American lawyers
21st-century American judges
Jones Day people
Judges of the United States Court of Appeals for the Sixth Circuit
Law clerks of the Supreme Court of the United States
Ohio State University Moritz College of Law alumni
People from Dhahran
Solicitors General of Ohio
United States court of appeals judges appointed by George W. Bush
Williams College alumni